The  was an AC electric multiple unit (EMU) train type operated by Hokkaido Railway Company (JR Hokkaido) on Sapporo area suburban services in Hokkaido, Japan, from 1968 until March 2015. It was the first AC EMU train to be operated in Japan by the former Japanese National Railways (JNR). The last remaining trains in service were withdrawn on 13 March 2015.

Fleet
By 1 October 2014, 36 vehicles (12 sets) were still in service, all based at Sapporo Depot.

Formations
The 711 series trains were formed as three-car sets with one motored intermediate car and two non-powered driving trailer cars, as shown below.

Car 2 was fitted with one N-PS785 single-arm pantograph.

Former prototype sets S901/902
The former prototype sets, S901 and S902 were formed as shown below.

Interior
Seating consisted of a mixture of transverse seating bays and longitudinal bench seating.

History

Prototype sets

Both sets were based on the KiHa 22 diesel multiple unit design, but set 901 had opening two-pane windows and featured two sets of four-leaf folding doors per side, whereas set 902 had sealed double-glazed windows, as used on the subsequent full-production sets. The two sets were modified to full-production standards in 1968 and 1970, but set 901 retained its opening windows.

Full-production sets
The first full-production three-car sets were delivered from August 1968. A third, centre, door was added to some of the KuHa 711 cars from 1987. All cars became no-smoking from 1 July 1992. Priority seating was added from 1 October 1997. Air conditioning was added to the two-door sets between 2001 and 2002. The original scissors-type pantographs were replaced with N-PS785 single-arm pantographs between 2004 and 2005.

Repainted sets

In 2011, set S-110 was repainted into its original JNR all-over crimson livery, and this was followed in May 2012 by a second similarly repainted set, S-114.

Withdrawal

The last remaining sets in service were withdrawn on 13 March 2015.

Preserved examples
, three 711 series vehicles have been preserved, as follows.
 KuHa 711 29: Preserved in Chitose, Hokkaido, and used as the "Cafe Garden Station" restaurant
 KuHa 711 103 + KuHa 711 203: Preserved outside in Iwamizawa, Hokkaido

References

Further reading

 

Electric multiple units of Japan
Hokkaido Railway Company
Train-related introductions in 1967
Hitachi multiple units
Tokyu Car multiple units
20 kV AC multiple units
Kawasaki multiple units